Ernani Christopher Mendoza Pacana III (born December 24, 1981) is a Filipino former professional basketball player who last played for the Barako Bull Energy Cola. Born to Ernani Pacana II and Elizabeth Mendoza-Pacana, he was the fifteenth draft pick of the Coca-Cola Tigers in 2006. He played for the Barangay Ginebra Kings from (2007-2009) where he was one of the factors of their championship run in the 2008 PBA Fiesta Conference. He was then signed by the Sta. Lucia Realtors and later the Meralco Bolts.

References

1981 births
Living people
Barako Bull Energy players
Barangay Ginebra San Miguel players
Basketball players from California
Filipino expatriate basketball people in Malaysia
Filipino men's basketball players
Meralco Bolts players
Sportspeople from West Covina, California
Point guards
Powerade Tigers players
Sta. Lucia Realtors players
Magnolia Hotshots players
Kuala Lumpur Dragons players
American men's basketball players
St. Francis Doves basketball players
Powerade Tigers draft picks
American sportspeople of Filipino descent
Citizens of the Philippines through descent